Indian Springs State Park is a 528-acre (2.14 km²) Georgia state park located near Jackson and Flovilla.  The park is named for its several springs, which the Creek Indians used for centuries to heal the sick.  The water from these springs is said to have a sulfur smell and taste. Indian Springs is thought to be the oldest state park in the nation.  It was acquired from the Creek Indians by the state through the Treaty of Indian Springs (1825) and the Treaty of Washington (1826).  Thereafter, Indian Springs has been operated continuously by the state as a public park, although it did not gain the title "State Park" until 1931.  The area became a resort town in the 19th century.  It became an official "State Forest Park" in 1927.  In 1931, along with Vogel State Park, it became a founding unit of Georgia's state park system.

Visitors are still allowed to sample the park's spring water, all the while enjoying swimming, fishing, and boating.  Several structures within the park were built during the Great Depression by members of the Civilian Conservation Corps.  The park also contains a 105-acre (0.42 km²) lake consistently stocked with fish, as well as a 3/4 mile (1.21 km) nature trail. A 3.25 mile (5.23 km) trail connects the park to Dauset Trails.

The park features a small museum that is open seasonally.  Exhibits include the park's natural history, the resort era, activities of the CCC, and the history and culture of the Creek Indians.

Facilities
62 Tent/Trailer/RV Campsites
10 Cottages
5 Picnic Shelters
1 Group Shelter
1 Group Camp
1 Stone Pavilion
1 Pioneer Campground
Miniature Golf Course
Boat Rental
Idlewilde Event Center

Annual events
Southeastern Indian Celebration (June)
Astronomy Program (August)
Christmas at Idelwilde (December)

Images

Indian Springs State Park Museum

References

External links
Stolen land Indian Springs State Park, official website
 1913 Geological Survey of Georgia, pages 94–95 cite a brief history and mineral content of the springs.

1825 establishments in Georgia (U.S. state)
State parks of Georgia (U.S. state)
Natural history museums in Georgia (U.S. state)
Museums in Butts County, Georgia
Civilian Conservation Corps in Georgia (U.S. state)
Nature centers in Georgia (U.S. state)
Protected areas established in 1927
Protected areas of Butts County, Georgia